The Carmel River (in French: rivière Carmel) is a tributary on the northeast shore of the Nicolet Southwest River. It crosses the municipalities of Sainte-Perpétue, Sainte-Monique and La Visitation-de-Yamaska, in the Nicolet-Yamaska Regional County Municipality (MRC), in the administrative region of Centre-du-Québec, in Quebec, in Canada.

Geography 

The main neighboring hydrographic slopes of the Carmel River are:
 north side: Leblanc stream, Nicolet River;
 east side: Nicolet River;
 south side: Nicolet Southwest River, Lafont River;
 west side: Nicolet Southwest River.

The Carmel River has its source in an agricultural zone to the northeast and to the east of the village of Sainte-Perpétue, on the northeast side of rang Saint-Charles road.

This river flows east in an agricultural zone, crossing the chemin du rang Saint-Joseph (route 259) in Sainte-Perpétue. The river then cuts the southern part of the municipality of Sainte-Monique, then it flows in the municipality of La Visitation-de-Yamaska.

The Carmel River drains on the northeast shore of the Southwest Nicolet River at a bend in the river.

Toponymy 
The toponym "Rivière Carmel" was made official on August 8, 1977, at the Commission de toponymie du Québec.

See also 

 Lake Saint-Pierre
 List of rivers of Quebec

References 

Rivers of Centre-du-Québec
Nicolet-Yamaska Regional County Municipality